Kevin Bechmann Timm (born 9 July 1989) is a Danish footballer who plays as a midfielder or a forward.

Career
Bechmann Timm played for FC Copenhagen as a youth player until he moved to Esbjerg fB in the summer of 2009.

In Esbjerg fB he played in the Superliga but after a disappointing year in 2012, he asked for his release in March 2012. Bechmann Timm then had a short stay at FC Roskilde the first half of year 2012.

On 30 July 2012 Bechmann Timm signed a 2-year deal with Akademisk Boldklub.

Later he went to Næstved Boldklub, where he helped them move from second to first division. After three years he left the club to go to his Fathers favorite club Brønshøj Boldklub.
For three consecutive years he became the top scorer and stopped his career due to difficult economical conditions in danish football.

He now work as trainer and mentor for young talents.

References

External links
Danish Superliga statistics

1989 births
Living people
Danish men's footballers
Danish 1st Division players
Danish 2nd Division players
Akademisk Boldklub players
Brønshøj Boldklub players
F.C. Copenhagen players
Esbjerg fB players
FC Roskilde players
Næstved Boldklub players
Association football forwards
Association football midfielders